In baseball statistics, strikeouts per nine innings pitched (K/9, SO/9, or SO/9IP) is the mean of strikeouts (or Ks) by a pitcher per nine innings pitched. It is determined by multiplying the number of strikeouts by nine, and dividing by the number of innings pitched. To qualify, a pitcher must have pitched 1,000 innings, which generally limits the list to starters. A separate list is maintained for relievers with 300 innings pitched or 200 appearances.

Leaders

The all-time leader in this statistic through 2021 was Robbie Ray (11.10). The only other pitchers who had averaged over 10 strikeouts were Chris Sale (11.08), Yu Darvish (11.04), Jacob deGrom (10.88), Max Scherzer (10.73), Randy Johnson (10.61), Stephen Strasburg (10.55), Gerrit Cole (10.39), Kerry Wood (10.32), Aaron Nola (10.08), and Pedro Martinez (10.04). 

The top three in 2022 were Carlos Rodon (11.98), Shohei Ohtani (11.87), and Gerrit Cole (11.53).

Among qualifying relievers, Aroldis Chapman (14.88) was the all-time leader in strikeouts per nine innings through 2020, followed by Craig Kimbrel (14.66), Kenley Jansen (13.25), Rob Dibble (12.17), David Robertson (11.93), and Billy Wagner (11.92).

Analysis
One effect of K/9 is that it may reward or "inflate" the numbers for pitchers with high batting averages on balls in play (BABIP). Two pitchers may have the same K/9 rates despite striking out a different percentage of batters since one pitcher will pitch to
more batters to obtain the same cumulative number of strikeouts. For example, a pitcher who strikes out one batter in an inning, but also gives up a walk or a hit, strikes out a lower percentage of batters than a pitcher who strikes out one batter in an inning without allowing a baserunner, but both have the same K/9.

References

Pitching statistics